Every Frame a Painting is a series of 28 video essays about film form, film editing, and cinematography created by Taylor Ramos and Tony Zhou between 2014 and 2016. They were first published on YouTube but have also been released on Vimeo.

Format
Each essay explores one particular topic, often a single creator, with many organized around a scene that illustrates the idea. For each essay, Zhou would do principal writing and research, Ramos would organize the thesis and make animations, and they both worked on the final editing process. The editing style, use of film clips, and remixing of audio were developed in response to YouTube's Content ID system, with the goal of meeting the criteria for fair use and to avoid being flagged by the copyright violation algorithm.

Zhou lamented that the format imposed by Content ID prevented them from making videos about creators like Andrei Tarkovsky and Agnès Varda, as they would require longer clips.

History
The first video was published on April 16, 2014, about Bong Joon-ho's Mother and the use of side-on profile shots. The final essay was published on September 12, 2016, about the use of orchestral sound in the Marvel Cinematic Universe. In total, the creators made 28 essays between 2014 and 2016. They published the script of the final, unproduced essay on Medium on December 2, 2017, as both a farewell and explanation for the series' end, as well as a postmortem with advice for future essayists.

Post-Every Frame a Painting
Since then, Ramos and Zhou have produced video essays released as special features for The Criterion Collection and the now-defunct FilmStruck (which would be restored via Criterion's own streaming service, The Criterion Channel). They have also recently contributed and directed video essays in Netflix's documentary series Voir, alongside the critics Sasha Stone, Walter Chaw, and Drew McWeeny. David Fincher and David Prior executive produced the series.

Reception
Kevin B. Lee, a film critic and video essayist, called the series "the standout newcomer to the video essay scene" in 2014. Many critics point to the essay on Jackie Chan and action comedy film as among the best.

Brian Raftery of Wired would later credit Every Frame a Painting for kicking off "a dramatic growth spurt" in YouTube-based movie criticism, stating that the channel's "astute, patient, visually assured film essays...help[ed] push the medium past its ranting-rando-with-a-camera phase".

Directors such as Edgar Wright, Seth Rogen, Christopher McQuarrie have given praise to Every Frame a Paintings essays.

See also
 Film editor
 Supercut

References

External links
 
 

Film criticism television series
YouTube channels launched in 2014
2010s YouTube series
2014 web series debuts
 2017 web series endings
Film theory
Essays about film